Chording means pushing several keys or buttons simultaneously to achieve a result.

Musical keyboards 

In music, more than one key are pressed at a time to achieve more complex sounds, or chords.

Computer keyboards 

Chording, with a chorded keyboard or keyer allows one to produce as many characters as a QWERTY keyboard but with fewer keys and less motion per finger.

Pointers 

Mouse chording allows a user to use a two-button mouse, trackball, or touchpad as if it where a three-button device. For example, in the Unix graphical user interface (known as X11), the middle button is used to paste text. Since Microsoft-type mice traditionally only had two buttons, users of Unix-type systems such as Linux and BSD chord the right and left buttons to paste text.

Multitouch chording  
TipTapSpeech an application for the iPhone and iPad is a chord-based text entry solution for touch screen computing.

A GKOS chording keyboard application development for iPhone was started on the GKOS Google Group  on May 25, 2009. The application for iPhone became available on May 8, 2010, and a similar application for Android on October 3, 2010. Thumbs are used to press the keys that are located towards the sides of the screen, either a single key or two keys simultaneously. - The further development of GKOS has led to the ComboKey keyboard that works better on smartphones. ComboKey also allows one-hand typing with the hand holding the device, generating combinations by occasional swipes to other keys.

Douglas Engelbart, Cherif Algreatly, Valerie Landau, Robert Stephenson, Evan Schaffer, and Eric Matsuno filed a patent in 2010 for a chorded solution for multitouch screens.

Minesweeper tactic 
In Minesweeper, chording may refer to a tactic which is traditionally done by left-clicking and right-clicking at the same time on an uncovered square to uncover all eight adjacent squares if it has the correct number of flags. In many newer versions of Minesweeper, chording can also be done by middle-clicking or by simply left-clicking.

References

See also 
 Ergonomics

Musical terminology
Computer keyboards
 Minesweeper (video game)